Trichoscypha oddonii, common name mbuta, is a species of plant in the family Anacardiaceae. It is found from Cameroon to the Congos and northern Angola. Mature trees reach 26m in height and leaves are up to 2.5m long. It is very similar to Trichoscypha acuminata in all characteristics, with the fruit being a little more acidic.

References

oddonii
Taxonomy articles created by Polbot
Taxa named by Émile Auguste Joseph De Wildeman
Flora of Africa